Metaplastes is a genus of southern European bush crickets in the subfamily Phaneropterinae and tribe Barbitistini.

Species
The Orthoptera Species File lists:
 Metaplastes ippolitoi  La Greca, 1948
 Metaplastes oertzeni (Brunner von Wattenwyl, 1891) - type species
 Metaplastes ornatus (Ramme, 1931)
 Metaplastes pulchripennis (A. Costa, 1863)

References

Phaneropterinae
Tettigoniidae genera